Gregory D. Tolver Jr. (born January 13, 1980) is a 6"1' 205 lbs. wide receiver for the Los Angeles Avengers in the Arena Football League (AFL). He was born on January 13, 1980, in Long Beach, California, to Gregory Tolver Sr. and Brenda Tolver. Tolver attended Mira Mesa Senior High School where he began his football career.

Playing career

High school

He was a two-year starter and a three-year letterman as the quarterback of the Mira Mesa Marauders. During his senior year, he was selected to the All-Academic team and he was also named the most valuable player for the Marauders. He passed for 1,880 yards and 15 touchdown along with 1,004 yards and 5 touchdowns in his last year. Tolver accounted for 410 yards alone (278 yards passing and 132 yards rushing). Although Tolver's main focus was football, he was also a two-year letterman on the Mira Mesa men's basketball team.

College career

Tolver attended college at San Diego State University where he would earn a degree in business. Tolver finished his collegiate career for the San Diego State Aztecs with a total of 262 receptions for 3,572 yards and 17 touchdowns. During his senior year with the Aztecs, he accumulated 128 catches for 1,785 yards and 13 touchdowns, which made him a unanimous choice to be on the All-Mountain West Conference First-team. He was also placed on a couple of All-American teams after leading the entire nation in receiving yards per game with 137 yards per contest (13.9 yards per reception). He also finished second in the nation in catches per game averaging close to 9 receptions per game. By scoring 86 points as a senior, Tolver led the San Diego State Aztecs in scoring and was honored by the Mountain West Conference as the Player of the Week three time including after a 12-reception, 296-yard game versus the Arizona State Sun Devils. During his junior season, he was the Aztecs' leading receiver with 63 receptions for 878 yards and 2 touchdowns. He became a starter as a redshirt sophomore followed by a 62-catch, 808-yard season.

Professional career

In the 2003 NFL Draft, Tolver was selected in the 5th round as the 169th pick by the Miami Dolphins. On November 25, 2003, he was placed on the injured reserve list due to a right knee injury. He was removed from the Injured Reserved list on February 23, 2004, but would eventually be cut on September 5, 2004. On October 19, 2005, Tolver was the newest addition to the Dallas Cowboys practice squad and on January 3, 2006, the Cowboys signed him to the team. But it would not last long with him being cut from the team on August 28, 2006. After spending four years in and out of the NFL, he finally landed in the Arena Football League signing a contract with the Los Angeles Avengers on February 14, 2008.

Broadcasting career

Tolver is a guest member on the NBC 7/39 Football Night sportscaster team in San Diego.

Coaching career

Tolver is the head coach for Sage Hill School's football team. His first season was the fall 2009 season where he led the Lightning a 7–4 season (2–1 in league) which helped redeem the team who only won 2 games in the 2008 season before Tolver signed on as the coach. In his second season, he led the Lightning to an 8–3 record. Tolver also serves as the school's athletic director.

Personal life

During his younger years, he collected over 5,000 sports card including Barry Sanders' and Jerry Rice's rookie cards. He also started a business of his own in solid waste management. Tolver's younger brother, Tredale Tolver, attended and played football at Cal Poly San Luis Obispo. Tolver also spent a number of years in Mansfield, Louisiana. His father was a standout quarterback at DeSoto High School in Mansfield and Lynwood High School in Lynwood, California, during the mid-1970s.

See also
 List of NCAA major college football yearly receiving leaders

References

Los Angeles Avengers bio
arenafootball.com bio
San Diego State Aztecs bio
J.R. Tolver, #87-WR

1980 births
Living people
Players of American football from Long Beach, California
Players of American football from San Diego
Players of Canadian football from Long Beach, California
Players of Canadian football from San Diego
American football wide receivers
American players of Canadian football
Canadian football wide receivers
San Diego State Aztecs football players
Miami Dolphins players
Carolina Panthers players
Dallas Cowboys players
Calgary Stampeders players
Los Angeles Avengers players